The New Zealand DM class Locomotives of 57 diesel-electric locomotives are a class under manufacture for New Zealand rail operator KiwiRail by Stadler Rail. The locomotives will be manufactured in Spain, and are expected to be introduced from early 2024 to 2026.

Background
The former New Zealand Railways Department (NZR) introduced 49 DX class locomotives into service between 1972 and 1977, all of which are now in service in the South Island. The locomotives are now almost 50 years old. In March 2020, KiwiRail released a tender for new mainline locomotives to replace the DX class.

The 2021 New Zealand budget allocated NZD$722.7 million to purchase new mainline locomotives, shunt locomotives and wagons.

On 11 October 2021 Stadler Rail announced it had won the contract to supply 57 new locomotives for KiwiRail. Stadler Rail stated the contract was worth €228 million, or NZD$403 million. The Rail & Maritime Transport Union, the main union representing KiwiRail staff, welcomed the purchase. Stadler Rail won a contract to supply 34 similar locomotives to the Taiwan Railway Administration in 2019.

Classification and numbering
KiwiRail has stated the locomotives will be classified as class "DM". Mock-ups of the locomotive cab show numbers in the 6000 series, which has not been used since the withdrawal of the DQ and QR class locomotives. It was reported in late 2022 that the design phase had been completed, and the first locomotives are now in production, to be completed in mid-2024.

See also
 New Zealand DL class locomotive
 Locomotives of New Zealand

References

Footnotes

Citations

Bibliography

 

Co-Co locomotives
Diesel-electric locomotives of New Zealand